Choto Shona Mosque (Small Golden Mosque) is located in Chapai Nawabganj district of Bangladesh.

History

The mosque was built during the reign of the Sultan of Bengal Alauddin Husain Shah, between 1493 and 1519. The fifteen domes of the mosque were once gilded, giving the mosque the name of Choto Shona Masjid (Small Golden Mosque). The mosque is one of the best-preserved sultana monuments under protection by the Department of Archaeology and Museums, Governments of Bangladesh. The gilding that gave the building its name does not exist anymore. The mosque premise, which covers an area of 42 m from east to west by 43.5 m from north to south, was originally surrounded by an outer wall (now restored) with a gateway in the middle of the east side.

Design

All the four walls are veneered externally and to some extent also internally with granite stone blocks. These stones have disappeared from the southern side of the west wall because of conservation works after the destruction by the earthquake of 1897. The four exterior angles of the building are strengthened with polygonal towers, of which nine facets are visible. The cornices are curvilinear and have stone gutters to drain off the rain water from the roof. There are five arched doorways in the eastern facade and three each on the north and south walls. Corresponding to the five archways in the east wall there are five semi-circular mihrabs inside the west wall. The stones of most of these miharbs have disappeared.

A wide central nave has cut the aisles into halves, each half showing six equal square units with a side of 3.5 m. The nave has three rectangular units, each measuring 3.5 by 4.5 m. The interior of the mosque has therefore a total of fifteen units, of which the three rectangular units are covered with chauchala vaults, and the remaining twelve square units each by an inverted tumbler-shaped dome. They are all carried on radiating arches springing from the free-standing stone pillars and the engaged pilasters. The upper corners in between the arches of the square units are filled with corbelled brick pendentive to make up the phase of transition for the domes. At the northwest corner of the mosque there is a royal gallery forming an upper floor, which is still standing in a dilapidated condition. It was approached from the northwest corner of the mosque through a stepped platform connected with a doorway. The gallery has a mihrab in front.

Stone carving, brick-setting, terracotta, gilding, and glazed tiles were used in decorating the building, and of them the former played the dominant role. The subject matters of the stone carving were chosen according to the demand of the spaces, e.g., the borders of the panels with creepers and their interior with various forms of stylised hanging patterns adapted from the chain-and-bell of the Bauddha and Jaina period. The spandrels of arches and the spaces above the frames are always dotted with rosettes, an attractive form of designs, but are all carved differently. The interior of the domes and vaults are decorated with terracottas, those of the vaults being copies of the bamboo frames of local huts. All the frontal archways and those of the mihrabs are cusped.

Ornamentation

The most important ornamentation of the mosque is to be seen on the frontal courtyard of the mosque, only recently excavated. The ornamentation consists of mosaic roundels in blue and white colours of variegated design. The mosaic design is not in situ, but a roundel has been composed by the excavators, putting the flakes in their appropriate places and exhibiting it in a room attached to the guesthouse nearby. At a distance of 14.5 m to the east of the gateway there is a stone platform containing two tomb sarcophagi inscribed with verses from the Quran and some names of God. It is unknown who is buried here. Cunningham suggests these are the tombs of Wali Muhammad, the builder of the mosque, and his father Ali.

Current situation
The glamour of the Chhoto Sona Masjid is not there as it was originally, particularly because of the stripping of the decorative mihrabs and the mosque courtyard, but the remains are nevertheless one of the most attractive monuments of Guar-Lakhnauti.

See also
 List of archaeological sites in Bangladesh

References

Further reading

 Husain, A. B. (2007). Architecture – A History Through Ages. Dhaka: Asiatic Society of Bangladesh, p. 117 , .
 Abu Sayeed, M. Ahmed (2006) Mosque Architecture in Bangladesh. UNESCO Dhaka. p. 102 . 
 The Islamic heritage of Bengal (1984) UNESCO, p. 69 .

Bengal Sultanate mosques
Mosques in Chapai Nawabganj
Architectural history